This is a bibliography of fiction by and works about the American writer Rex Stout (December 1, 1886 – October 27, 1975), an American writer noted for his detective fiction. He began his literary career in the 1910s, writing more than 40 stories that appeared primarily in pulp magazines between 1912 and 1918. He wrote no fiction for more than a decade, until the late 1920s, when he had saved enough money through his business activities to write when and what he pleased. In 1929, he wrote his first published book, How Like a God, an unusual psychological story written in the second person. He wrote a pioneering political thriller, The President Vanishes (1934), before specializing in detective fiction. His 1934 novel Fer-de-Lance introduced his best-known characters, detective Nero Wolfe and his assistant Archie Goodwin,  who were featured in 33 novels and 39 novellas and short stories between 1934 and 1975. In 1959, Stout received the Mystery Writers of America's Grand Master Award. The Nero Wolfe corpus was nominated Best Mystery Series of the Century at Bouchercon XXXI, the world's largest mystery convention, and Rex Stout was nominated Best Mystery Writer of the Century.

In addition to writing fiction, Stout was a prominent public intellectual for decades. He was active in the early years of the American Civil Liberties Union and a founder of the Vanguard Press. Stout served as head of the Writers' War Board during World War II, became a radio celebrity through his numerous broadcasts, and was later active in promoting World Federalism. He was the longtime president of the Authors Guild and served a term as president of the Mystery Writers of America.

Nero Wolfe corpus

Nero Wolfe books
Rex Stout's Nero Wolfe books (novels and collections of novellas and short stories) are listed in order of publication. For specific publication history, including original magazine appearances, see entries for individual titles. Years link to year-in-literature articles.

Other Nero Wolfe works

Works related to Nero Wolfe

Other works

Novels

Short stories

Edited volumes

Poetry

Books about Rex Stout and Nero Wolfe
 Anderson, David R., Rex Stout (1984, Frederick Ungar; Hardcover  / Paperback ). Study of the Nero Wolfe series.
 Baring-Gould, William S., Nero Wolfe of West Thirty-fifth Street (1969, Viking Press). Fanciful biography. Reviewed in Time, March 21, 1969
 Bourne, Michael, Corsage: A Bouquet of Rex Stout and Nero Wolfe (1977, James A. Rock & Co, Publishers; Hardcover  / Paperback ). Posthumous collection produced in a numbered limited edition of 276 hardcovers and 1,500 softcovers. Shortly before his death Rex Stout authorized the editor to include the first Nero Wolfe novella, "Bitter End" (1940), which had not been republished in his own novella collections. Corsage also includes an interview Bourne conducted with Stout (July 18, 1973; also available on audiocassette tape), and concludes with the only book publication of "Why Nero Wolfe Likes Orchids," an article by Rex Stout that first appeared in Life (April 19, 1963).
 Darby, Ken, The Brownstone House of Nero Wolfe (1983, Little, Brown and Company). Biography of the brownstone "as told by Archie Goodwin." Includes detailed floor plans.
 Gotwald, Rev. Frederick G., The Nero Wolfe Handbook (1985; revised 1992, 2000). Self-published anthology of essays edited by a longtime member of The Wolfe Pack.
 Kaye, Marvin, The Archie Goodwin Files (2005, Wildside Press). Selected articles from The Wolfe Pack publication The Gazette, edited by a charter member.
 Kaye, Marvin, The Nero Wolfe Files (2005, Wildside Press). Selected articles from The Wolfe Pack publication The Gazette, edited by a charter member.
 McAleer, John, Rex Stout: A Biography (1977, Little, Brown and Company). Foreword by P.G. Wodehouse. Winner of the Mystery Writers of America's Edgar Award for Best Critical/Biographical Work in 1978. Reissued as Rex Stout: A Majesty's Life (2002, James A. Rock & Co., Publishers; Hardcover  / Paperback ).
 McAleer, John, Royal Decree: Conversations with Rex Stout (1983, Pontes Press, Ashton, MD). Published in a numbered limited edition of 1,000 copies.
 McBride, O.E., Stout Fellow: A Guide Through Nero Wolfe's World (2003, iUniverse; Hardcover  / Paperback ). Pseudonymous self-published homage.
 Mitgang, Herbert, Dangerous Dossiers: Exposing the Secret War Against America's Greatest Authors (1988, Donald I. Fine, Inc.). Chapter 10 is titled "Seeing Red: Rex Stout."
 Symons, Julian, Great Detectives: Seven Original Investigations (1981, Abrams). Illustrated by Tom Adams. "We quiz Archie Goodwin in his den and gain a clue to the ultimate fate of Nero Wolfe" in a chapter titled "In Which Archie Goodwin Remembers."
 Townsend, Guy M., Rex Stout: An Annotated Primary and Secondary Bibliography (1980, Garland Publishing). Associate editors John McAleer, Judson Sapp and Arriean Schemer. Definitive publication history.
 Van Dover, J. Kenneth, At Wolfe's Door: The Nero Wolfe Novels of Rex Stout (1991, Borgo Press, Milford Series; updated edition 2003, James A. Rock & Co., Publishers; Hardcover  / Paperback ). Bibliography, reviews and essays.

Notes

References

Bibliographies by writer
Bibliographies of American writers
Mystery fiction bibliographies
Works by Rex Stout